Domaine Pinnacle is a family-owned orchard, cidery, and maple-grove located near the village of Frelighsburg in the Eastern Townships of Quebec, Canada.

Founded in 2000 by Charles Crawford and Susan Reid as a cidery, the company's products are available today in more than 50 countries, having won more than 60 gold medals in prestigious national and international competitions.

In 2016, it sold its spirit business to Corby Spirit and Wine. Also in 2016, the cider business got integrated in the newly formed CidreCo venture.

Location 
Located near Mount Pinnacle in Frelighsburg, the estate hosts century-old apple orchards and a farmhouse originally built in 1859.  The farmhouse's distinguishing feature is an octagonal rooftop lookout turret that was used to keep a watch on the nearby Vermont border. Local residents claim that, in its first years, the house served as a stop on the famous underground railroad providing a safe haven for slaves seeking freedom. 
Many years later, it became a convenient meeting place for bootleggers during the Prohibition Era.

Also located on the property is Domaine Pinnacle's boutique, open year-round to the public and offering tastings of products with appropriate food pairings, self-guided tours and an interpretation center demonstrating the company's heritage and production process.

Products 
Ice Cider: Domaine Pinnacle Ice Cider, Domaine Pinnacle Sparkling Ice Cider, Domaine Pinnacle Signature Réserve Spéciale Ice Cider, Domaine Pinnacle Summit Selection Ice Cider, Domaine Pinnacle Summit Selection Sparkling Ice Cider, Domaine Pinnacle Reserve 1859, Coureur des Bois Maple Ice Cider, Reflet d'Hiver
Hard Cider: Domaine Pinnacle Verger Sud Still Cider, Domaine Pinnacle Verger Sud Sparkling Cider, Origine Still Cider, Origine Sparkling Cider

Product timeline

See also 
 Ice Cider
 Cream Liqueur

References 

Companies based in Quebec